Antoine Toussaint de Chazal (1770–1854) was a French settler established as a planter on the  (now Mauritius).

De Chazal was born on 15 December 1770, in Port Louis, .

He was an amateur painter and is known for his portrait of the British cartographer and Royal Navy captain Matthew Flinders, painted in 1806–1807.

The fourth edition of the Benezit Dictionary of Artists confuses him with the painter Antoine Chazal (1793–1854).

He died in Moka, on 25 December 1822 and is an ancestor of Malcolm de Chazal.

Work 

 Portrait of Captain Matthew Flinders, oil on canvas, 50x64.5 cm. Gift of David Roche in memory of his father, J.D.K. Roche, and the South Australian Government 2000, to the Art Gallery of South Australia, Adelaide.

References 

 "Flinders Captain Flinders at Flinders: an exhibition of his oil portrait by Chazal", Adelaide, Flinders University Library, 1988.
 
 

1770 births
1822 deaths
Mauritian politicians
Mauritian people of French descent
19th-century painters
People from Port Louis District
People from Pamplemousses District
Mauritian artists